Murtough O'Brien can refer to:

 Muircheartach Ua Briain, (d. 1119), High King of Ireland, 1101-1119
 Muircheartach Ó Briain, King of Thomond, King of Thomond, victor in the Battle of Dysert O'Dea